Ebbw Vale Town railway station (Welsh: Gorsaf rheilffordd Tref Glyn Ebwy) serves the town centre of Ebbw Vale in Blaenau Gwent, Wales, serving as the terminus of the Ebbw Valley Railway.

History

The origins of the Ebbw Valley Railway can be traced to the wooden tramways and waggonways which served the various coal mines and steel works in the upper Ebbw Valley, to enable them to receive raw materials and dispatch products. Developments around Ebbw Vale itself were most associated with the Beaufort Ironworks Tramway, which opened in 1798 between the ironworks as far as Crumlin. Originally developed as a single-platform station, by 1923 at the time of railway grouping Ebbw Vale (Low Level) railway station boasted a staff of 44.

Ebbw Vale (High Level) railway station was opened by the London and North Western Railway on 2 September 1867. To distinguish the two Ebbw Vale stations, British Railways added the suffix "High Level" (the L&NWR station) on 23 May 1949 and "Low Level" (the GWR station) on 19 July 1950. Both stations closed to passengers on 30 April 1962. Closure of the lines to goods traffic came on 1 December 1969.

Development
In the 2008 Network Rail Route Utilisation Strategy, the link between Ebbw Vale and Newport was identified for implementation in the period 2009–2018. In May 2013, the Welsh Government announced that the Ebbw Vale line would be extended from the existing terminus at Ebbw Vale Parkway to the new station at Ebbw Vale Town. A total of £11.5 million was agreed to fund the station, line extension and associated landscaping for the surrounding area. Two weeks later, funding was also agreed for Pye Corner railway station, also along the line.

Opening

The Ebbw Vale Town Station extension opened 17 May 2015. There is an hourly service, Monday – Saturday, to Cardiff Central, and an approximately two-hourly service via Newport on Sundays.

Stage two
Under the proposals of stage two of the project, a half-hourly service would be introduced, and a two-platform station would be built as the northern terminus of the line, close to the old British Steel General Office Site part of "the Works" development. This can only be enabled through additional passing loops and track infrastructure being provisioned by 2018 in the Newport and Crosskeys to Llanhilleth area. Funding for the project will mainly come from the Welsh Assembly Government, and many other stakeholders.

Bus station 
The station is an eight-minute walk from the Ebbw Vale bus station (also known as Inner Bypass), which is the terminus for a number of Stagecoach South Wales services to Cardiff, Abergavenny, Brynmawr, Tredegar, and other nearby villages.

Notes

References

External links

Railway stations in Blaenau Gwent
Railway stations opened by Network Rail
Railway stations in Great Britain opened in 2015
Railway stations served by Transport for Wales Rail
Transport in Ebbw Vale
2015 establishments in Wales